"So Beautiful" is a song by Australian singer-songwriter Pete Murray. The song was originally included on Murray's debut album, The Game (2001), and was re-recorded for his following album, Feeler (2003). This version was released as the album's third single in January 2004. "So Beautiful" became Murray's first charting single, peaking at  9 on the ARIA Singles Chart and earning a platinum sales certification. It also charted in New Zealand, peaking at No. 13, and in the Netherlands, reaching No. 61. "So Beautiful" was nominated for several awards in 2004 and 2005.

Background
Murray was inspired to write the song after seeing a group of "pretentious" people in a Brisbane bar. In a 2013 interview, he said: I can't stand pretentious people like that. I remember the way they strutted around and they were really loud and obnoxious and I just had to get out of there. I don't have time for that. As soon as I got home, I started writing the song. I was trying to get the point across that these guys needed to take a good look at themselves and see how they were acting." "So Beautiful" has been widely used as a break-up song, though this was not Murray's intention.

Awards and nominations
At the ARIA Music Awards of 2004, the song was nominated for five awards; Best Male Artist, Best Pop Release, Single of the Year and Best Video, while Murray and McKercher were nominated for Producer of the Year for "So Beautiful". At the APRA Music Awards of 2005, the song won the award for Song of the Year.

Track listing
Australian maxi-CD
 "So Beautiful" – 4:40
 "Decade" – 4:25
 "Bitter" – 4:36
 "To a Friend" – 4:23

Charts

Weekly charts

Year-end charts

Certifications

Release history

References

2001 songs
2004 singles
APRA Award winners
Pete Murray (Australian singer-songwriter) songs
Songs written by Pete Murray (Australian singer-songwriter)
Sony Music Australia singles